OPH may refer to:
Aryldialkylphosphatase, an enzyme
Ophiuchus, a constellation
Original Pancake House, an American restaurant chain